The 2009 FIBA Africa Women's Clubs Champions Cup (15th edition), was an international basketball tournament  held in Cotonou, Benin, from 13 to 22 November 2009. The tournament, organized by FIBA Africa and hosted by Energie, was contested by 10 clubs split into 2 groups, the first four of which qualifying for the knock-out stage.
 
The tournament was won by First Bank from Nigeria.

Draw

Squads

Qualification

Preliminary rounds
Times given below are in UTC+1.

Group A

Group B

Knockout stage

9th place

Quarter finals

5th-8th place

Semifinals

7th place

5th place

Bronze medal game

Gold medal game

Final standings

First Bank rosterAdeola Olanrewaju, Brisa Silva, Chioma Udeaja, Danielle Green, Funmilayo Ojelabi, Mfon Udoka, Rashidat Sadiq, Coach: Adewunmi Aderemi

All Tournament Team

See also 
 2009 FIBA Africa Championship for Women

References

External links 
 2012 FIBA Africa Champions Cup for Women Official Website
 

2009 FIBA Africa Women's Clubs Champions Cup
2009 FIBA Africa Women's Clubs Champions Cup
2009 FIBA Africa Women's Clubs Champions Cup
FIBA